Afe Babalola   (born 30 October 1929) is a Nigerian lawyer and founder of Afe Babalola University.

Early life and education 

Afe Babalola was born in Ekiti State South Western Nigeria. He attended Emmanuel Primary School, Ado Ekiti. He enrolled for the Senior Cambridge School Certificate examination by private study from Wolsey Hall, Oxford. He later obtained the  A’Level certificate of London University before he proceeded to London School of Economics where he received a bachelor's degree in Economics. 
He worked briefly at the Central Bank of Nigeria before he left to the University of London where he obtained a bachelor's degree in Law.
In 1963, he was called to the England bar, the same year he became a member of Lincoln's Inn, London.

Legal career 
Afe Babalola began his career at Ibadan, the capital of Oyo State, western Nigeria as a litigation lawyer at Olu Ayoola and Co, law firm. In 1965, after two years of legal practice, he established his own law firm, Afe Babalola and Co. (Emmanuel Chambers).
In 1987, he became a Senior Advocate of Nigeria, the highest rank in Legal profession in Nigeria. In 2001, he was appointed, Pro-Chancellor of the University of Lagos by Chief Olusegun Obasanjo, the former President of Nigeria. He held the position till 2008 during which he emerged as best Pro-Chancellor of Nigerian Universities consecutively in 2005 and 2006.  
In 2009, he established Afe Babalola University to promote education in Nigeria. In 2013, the university was ranked the second best private university in Nigeria and 17 of 136 universities in Nigeria.

Personal life 
Babalola is married to Modupe Mercy Babalola. He has nine children, including Bolanle Austen-Peters.

Footnotes

1929 births
Living people
Yoruba legal professionals
People from Ekiti State
Nigerian human rights activists
Alumni of the London School of Economics
Academic staff of the University of Lagos
Yoruba academics
Senior Advocates of Nigeria
Commanders of the Order of the Federal Republic
20th-century Nigerian lawyers
21st-century Nigerian lawyers
Founders of Nigerian schools and colleges
University and college founders